Redeeming Love is a 2022 American Christian Western romance film directed by D.J. Caruso, who co-wrote the screenplay with Francine Rivers. The film is based on Rivers' 1991 novel of the same name, which was based on the Biblical story of Hosea, and is set in the American Old West during the California Gold Rush. It stars Abigail Cowen, Tom Lewis and Logan Marshall-Green.

The film was co-produced by Pinnacle Peak Pictures, Mission Pictures International, and Nthibah Pictures, and was filmed in Cape Town, South Africa. It was theatrically released by Universal Pictures on January 21, 2022, and received generally negative reviews from critics, though it was received better by audiences. Redeeming Love was nominated for the GMA Dove Award for Inspirational Film/Series of the Year at the 2022 GMA Dove Awards.

Plot
During the 1850s, a beautiful young woman called Angel works as a prostitute in the fictional California town of Pair-a-Dice. Despite being the object of desire for the local men, she survives through hatred and self-loathing. Meanwhile, a visiting farmer named Michael Hosea prays to God and asks for help finding a wife. Later that day, he sees Angel walking through town and falls in love at first sight.

Flashbacks reveal that Angel's real name is Sarah and that she knows only abuse from men. As a child, she overhears her father, Alex Stafford, saying that she should never have been born. Sarah learns that her father is married and her mother, Mae, is his mistress. Alex eventually cuts off support for Mae, obliging her to become a prostitute and eventually become sick and die. Distraught, Sarah rejects her mother's Catholic faith. Afterward, Mae's pimp sells an 8-year-old Sarah to a man named Duke, who renames her "Angel" and forces her into prostitution. One night, when Angel is a teenager, one of her customers is her father, and she knowingly has sex with him to punish him for how he treated her mother. He does not recognize her, but when he finds out the next morning, he commits suicide. This prompts Angel to escape from Duke. She arrives in California with hopes of beginning a new life but, penniless, once again becomes a prostitute at a brothel there.

In the present day, when Michael enters Angel's room and tells her he wants to marry her, she is thrown off-guard but remains aloof toward him. It is not until after she is nearly beaten to death by a brothel guard, that she agrees to marry Michael and leaves with him. He nurses her back to health at his home, despite her continued aloofness toward him. Michael continues to surprise her as he claims to love her as his wife, and refuses to have sex with her. Afraid to trust him, she runs away at her first opportunity, but Michael finds her and convinces her to come home. 

As the two begin their life on the farm, Angel develops feelings for Michael but runs away again when she realizes that he wants children, as she believes herself to be sterile. She gets a ride with Michael's brother-in-law, Paul, who hates her because of her past and demands that she pay him for the ride by having sex with him. Back in the city, Angel reluctantly returns to prostitution. When Michael arrives to rescue her from her employers, she is relieved to return home with him. He forgives her, and their relationship begins to blossom based on honesty and affection. 

As Angel falls in love with Michael, she becomes convinced that he will be happier married to someone else who can have children, leading her to leave him once more. Having learned to cook while with Michael, she is able to get a job at a cafe in the city rather than returning to prostitution. Eventually, she by chance encounters Duke, who has moved to California. He attempts to force her to become a prostitute again. Desperate, she regains the faith she lost after her mother's death and tells an audience at the brothel about Duke's sexual trafficking of young girls. Duke denies the allegations and attempts to murder Angel, but an African American man, who is implied to be an old friend of Michael's, subdues him and the captive girls escape into the audience, resulting in Duke being lynched by an outraged mob. Afterward, Angel starts a successful mission to help rehabilitate other young prostitutes.

Three years later, Paul finally comes to find her and tells her that Michael still loves her. Angel returns home to Michael, offering her love and telling him that her real name is Sarah. They reunite and are shown to eventually have children.

Cast

Abigail Cowen as Angel
Tom Lewis as Michael Hosea
Logan Marshall-Green as Paul
Wu Kexi as Mai Ling
Livi Birch as Sarah Stafford
Famke Janssen as Duchess
Nina Dobrev as Mae
Eric Dane as Duke

Production
Filming concluded in Cape Town, South Africa in March 2020. The film itself was announced in April 2020, with D.J. Caruso directing and Roma Downey and Francine Rivers executive producing. Rivers also wrote the script, along with Caruso. Redeeming Love marks the second collaboration between producers Cindy Bond and Simon Swart, the first being 2018's I Can Only Imagine. Wayne Fitzjohn, Michael Scott, and Brittany Yost also produce.

The film was released digitally on February 8, 2022, and was released on Blu-ray and DVD on March 8, 2022 by Universal Pictures Home Entertainment.

Release

The film was released in theaters on January 21, 2022 in the United States.

The film was released for VOD platforms on February 8, 2022, followed by a Blu-ray and DVD release on March 8, 2022.

Reception

Box office
Universal Pictures put the film went into wide release, in 1,903 theaters, on January 21, 2022. Projected to gross less than $5 million domestically in its first three days, it earned $3.5 million in its opening weekend, finishing fourth at the box office. The film dropped out of the box office top ten in its fourth weekend, finishing twelfth with $354,835. The film was a box office bomb, taking in $9.46 million worldwide, against a budget of $30 million.

Critical response
 On Metacritic, the film has a score of 32% based on reviews from 7 critics, indicating "generally unfavorable reviews."

References

External links

2022 romantic drama films
2022 Western (genre) films
2020s American films
2020s English-language films
American romantic drama films
American Western (genre) films
Book of Hosea
Films about the California Gold Rush
Films about prostitution in the United States
Films based on adaptations
Films based on American novels
Films based on the Hebrew Bible
Films based on romance novels
Films based on Western (genre) novels
Films directed by D. J. Caruso
Films produced by David A. R. White
Films scored by Brian Tyler
Films set in the 1850s
Films set in Boston
Films set in California
Films set in San Francisco
Films shot in South Africa
Incest in film
Pure Flix Entertainment films
Universal Pictures films